Laurence Tieleman (born 14 November 1972) is a former tennis player from Italy.

Personal life
Tieleman has a Dutch father and an Italian mother, both working for the European Community. He began playing tennis at age seven and attended the Nick Bollettieri Tennis Academy in Bradenton, FL, United States from ages 13 to 17.

Tieleman resided in both Assisi and Brussels during his playing career.

Tennis career

Turning professional in 1993, he won one tour-level doubles title (Tashkent in 1998) and 3 Challenger events in singles during his career. Tieleman's best singles performance was finishing runner-up at Queen's in 1998. The right-hander reached his career-high ATP singles ranking of World No. 76 in April 1999.

ATP career finals

Singles: 1 (1 runner-up)

Doubles: 1 (1 title)

ATP Challenger and ITF Futures finals

Singles: 5 (3–2)

Doubles: 17 (7–10)

Performance timelines

Singles

Doubles

References

External links
 
 
 

1972 births
Living people
Italian male tennis players
Italian people of Dutch descent
People from Assisi
Sportspeople from Brussels
Sportspeople from the Province of Perugia
Belgian people of Italian descent